Rud Shir-e Ziranbuh (also romanized as Rūd Shīr-e Zīrānbūh; also known as Rūd Shīr-e Bālā) is a village in Khafri Rural District, in the Central District of Sepidan County, Fars Province, Iran. At the 2006 census, its population was 374, in 92 families.

References 

Populated places in Sepidan County